The 2010–11 Wessex Football League was the 25th season of the Wessex Football League. The league champions for the third time in succession were Poole Town, who were promoted to the Southern League after being denied the previous two seasons due to ground grading problems. There was the usual programme of promotion and relegation between the two Wessex League divisions.

For sponsorship reasons, the league was known as the Sydenhams Wessex League.

League tables

Premier Division
The Premier Division consisted of 22 clubs, the same as the previous season, after Wimborne Town were promoted to the Southern League, and Cowes Sports were relegated to Division One. Two new clubs joined:
Fawley, runners-up in Division One.
Hamble A.S.S.C., champions of Division One.

Division One
Division One consisted of 19 clubs, reduced from 21 the previous season, after Hamble A.S.S.C. and Fawley were promoted to the Premier Division, Farnborough North End transferred to the Combined Counties League and A.F.C. Aldermaston were relegated to the Hampshire League. Two clubs joined:
Cowes Sports, relegated from the Premier Division.
Pewsey Vale, joining from the Wiltshire League.

References

Wessex Football League seasons
9